Shree Singaji Super Thermal Power Project is a coal-fired power plant of MPPGCL located near Dongaliya village near by Mundi of Khandwa District in Madhya Pradesh state of India. This project is owned by MPPGCL  (Madhya Pradesh Power Generating company limited). The water required is taken from Indira Sagar Reservoir on Narmada River. Coal linkage is achieved with South Eastern Coalfields Limited.

Installed capacity 
The Project was originally envisaged to be constructed in three development phases, but only two of the three phases have been approved for construction.

The first phase consists of 2 units with a generation capacity of 600 MW each. First unit was commissioned in February 2014 and, the second unit is expected to complete in October 2014.

The second phase consists of 2 units with generation capacity of 660 MW each. These units would be super critical thermal plants. , construction of phase two had not yet started.

References 

Coal-fired power stations in Madhya Pradesh
Khandwa district
2014 establishments in Madhya Pradesh
Energy infrastructure completed in 2014